At least two ships of the Brazilian Navy have borne the name Mato Grosso

 , a  launched in 1908 and stricken in 1946
  an  launched in 1944 as USS Compton, acquired by Brazil in 1972 and stricken in 1990

Brazilian Navy ship names